Don Mueang (lit. 'the upland where the town is located'; often spelled "Don Muang") is one of the 50 districts (khet) of Bangkok, Thailand. It is bounded by (from north clockwise): Mueang Pathum Thani and Lam Luk Ka of Pathum Thani province; Sai Mai, Bang Khen and Lak Si of Bangkok; and Pak Kret of Nonthaburi province. Don Mueang regarded as the uppermost part of Bangkok.

History
Don Mueang was once part of Bang Khen, but it became a district in its own right in 1989. Later in 1997, the southern part of Don Mueang was split off to establish a new district, Lak Si.

Don Mueang was originally called "Don I Yiao" ('the unpland of hawks'), because of the upland terrain. The water was not flooded and teeming with wildlife including a variety of birds of prey, as well as hawk, hence the name. There was a number of people living in about 50 households only. Access to the area was only possible by railway.

The new name was given by King Vajiravudh when the Royal Thai Air Force base was established there. When air force base and airport were established prosperity gradually entered Don Mueang respectively.

Places

 Don Mueang International Airport
 Don Muang Royal Thai Air Force Base
 Royal Thai Air Force Museum

Administration
The district is divided into three sub-districts (khwaengs).

Politics 
Don Mueang has been a stronghold for the Pheu Thai Party (and its predecessors, Thai Rak Thai Party and People's Power Party), winning in every general and gubernatorial elections after the 2006 coup and is considered a "deep red" district. The last time the Democrats had an MP in the constituency was in 1976. However in late-2012, Kanoknuch Naksuwanpha, a Democrat and a long-time local politician, won an upset election to secure her seat on the city council. It is believed that the reason she won was because of her long ties with Don Mueang as she built her political base in the area for decades.

Later in the mid-2013, Tankhun Jitt-itsara, a Democrat candidate, defeated Yuranunt Pamornmontri, a Pheu Thai candidate, in the Don Mueang by-election to replace the former MP Karun Hosakul, who had been disqualified by the Election Commission of Thailand (ECT). It was the Democrat Party's first victory in the district in almost 40 years.

MPs
 1995-1996: Paveena Hongsakul, Hangthong Thammawattana, Sumit Sundaravej
 1996-2000: Paveena Hongsakul, Hangthong Thammawattana, Sumit Sundaravej
 2001-2005: M.R. Damrongdit Disakul
 2005-2006: Janista Lewchalermvongse
 2007-2011: Anusorn Punthong, Anudith Nakornthap, Karun Hosakul
 2011–2014: Surachat Thianthong (11th)
 2011-2013: Karun Hosakul (12th)
 2013–2014: Tankhun Jitt-itsara (12th)
 Vacant due to 2014 Thai coup d'état
 2019–present: Karun Hosakul (10th)

Electoral district
 2007 - Bangkok 5th district
 2011 - Bangkok 11th district (Sanam Bin), Bangkok 12th district (Don Mueang, Si Kan)
 2019 - Bangkok 10th district

District Council
The district council for Don Mueang has eight members who serve four-year terms. 2006 Thailand local elections were last held on 30 April 2006. The results were:
Chart Thai Party: seven seats
Thai Rak Thai Party: one seat

Economy
The economy is dominated by the presence of Don Mueang International Airport. Airports of Thailand has its head office at Don Mueang. Thai Lion Air also has its head office in the district. The head offices of R Airlines and Solar Air are on the property of Don Mueang Airport.

Education

Harrow International School, Bangkok is in the district.

References

External links

 BMA website
 Don Mueang district office (Thai only)

Districts of Bangkok